The DHB-Supercup (English: German Handball Supercup) is an handball tournament held annually between the Handball-Bundesliga champions and the DHB-Pokal champion.

Results

Total titles won

Notes

References

Handball in Germany